Coleophora ononidella is a moth of the family Coleophoridae. It is found south of the line running from France to Cyprus.

The larvae feed on Ononis arvensis, Ononis spinosa and Ononis spinosa antiquorum. They create a white, yellow or brown pistol case with a large, transparent pallium that covers most of the case. Larvae can be found from March to May.

References

External links

ononidella
Moths described in 1879
Moths of Europe